Shota Samsonovich Chochishvili (10 July 1950 – 27 August 2009) was a Georgian professional wrestler and judoka.

Judo career 
Between 1972 and 1977, he won one gold, four silver and three bronze medals at the Olympics and world and European championships, including an Olympic gold medal in 1972.

Professional wrestling career

New Japan Pro-Wrestling (1989)
In 1989, Chochishvili briefly competed in the Japanese New Japan Pro-Wrestling (NJPW) promotion. On 24 April at NJPW's inaugural Tokyo Dome event called Battle Satellite in Tokyo Dome, Chochishvili competed in a match against NJPW founder Antonio Inoki, defeating him by knockout to win the WWF World Martial Arts Heavyweight Championship. On 25 May, Chochishvili defended the title against Inoki, but was unsuccessful with Inoki winning the match and championship by submission. On New Year's Eve 1989, he was involved in the first wrestling event held in the USSR hosted by NJPW in Moscow. In the tag team match main event, Chochishvili teamed with Inoki to defeat former Olympic wrestlers Masa Saito and Brad Rheingans.

Personal life
In retirement Chochishvili worked as a judo coach; he also served as vice-president of the Georgian Olympic Committee and of the Georgian Judo Federation. His son Ramaz became an international judoka and competed for Ukraine. In 2003, Chochishvili had a heart surgery and was diagnosed with cancer. From 2004–2008, he underwent chemotherapy, but died from leukemia in 2009, aged 59.

Championships and accomplishments
 New Japan Pro-Wrestling
 WWF World Martial Arts Heavyweight Championship (1 time)

References

1950 births
2009 deaths
Soviet male judoka
Male judoka from Georgia (country)
Judoka at the 1972 Summer Olympics
Judoka at the 1976 Summer Olympics
Olympic judoka of the Soviet Union
Medalists at the 1972 Summer Olympics
Medalists at the 1976 Summer Olympics
Olympic medalists in judo
Olympic gold medalists for the Soviet Union
Olympic bronze medalists for the Soviet Union
Professional wrestlers from Georgia (country)
Deaths from cancer in Georgia (country)
Deaths from leukemia